Malavika Sarukkai is an Indian classical dancer and choreographer specializing in Bharatanatyam. A 2002 winner of the Sangeet Natak Akademi Award, she was honoured by the Government of India in 2003 with Padma Shri, the fourth highest Indian civilian award.

Biography
Malavika Sarukkai was born in 1959 in the South Indian state of Tamil Nadu. She began learning Bharatanatyam at the age of 7 and trained under Kalyanasundaram Pillai(Tanjavur school) and Rajaratnam (Vazhuvoor School). She also learned abhinaya under Kalanidhi Narayanan and Odissi under renowned gurus, Kelucharan Mohapatra and Ramani Ranjan Jena. She made her debut at the age of 12 at Mumbai and has performed at many places in India and abroad, including the Lincoln Center for the Performing Arts, New York, John F. Kennedy Center for the Performing Arts and at Chicago. Her life and work have been recorded by way of a documentary, Samarpanam, commissioned by the Government of India. She also features in a nine-hour television documentary by BBC/WNET under the title, Dancing. The Unseen Sequence – Exploring Bharatanatyam Through the Art of Malavika Sarukkai is another documentary made on her art which has been screened at the National Centre for the Performing Arts. Mumbai.

Awards and recognitions

Sarukkai was awarded the Sangeet Natak Akademi Award by the Government of India in 2002. She is also a recipient of Kalaimamani title from the Government of Tamil Nadu and other awards such as Mrinalini Sarabhai Award, Nrityachoodamani title, Sanskriti award and the Haridas Sammelan award. The Government of India honoured her again, in 2003, with the civilian award of Padma Shri.

See also

 Bharatanatyam
 Odissi

References

External links
 
 
 

Recipients of the Padma Shri in arts
Dancers from Tamil Nadu
Performers of Indian classical dance
Living people
Bharatanatyam exponents
Recipients of the Sangeet Natak Akademi Award
1959 births
Indian women choreographers
Indian choreographers
Recipients of the Kalaimamani Award
Indian female classical dancers
20th-century Indian dancers
20th-century Indian women artists
Women artists from Tamil Nadu